Cauffry is a commune in the Oise department in northern France.

Personalities
 Adrien Vachette, 19th-century goldsmith

See also
 Communes of the Oise department

References

Communes of Oise